The Diving competition in the 1981 Summer Universiade were held in Bucharest, Romania.

Medal overview

Medal table

 Men's 3-Meter Springboard

 Men's Platform

 Women's 3-Meter Springboard

 Women's Platform

References
 

1981 Summer Universiade
1981
1981 in diving